The 2019–20 Under 20 Elite League is an age-restricted association football tournament for national Under-20 teams. It was the third edition of the Under 20 Elite League but was ultimately curtailed after the 5th round of games in November 2019 due to the COVID-19 pandemic.

Participating teams

League table

Results

References

Under 20 Elite League
2019–20 in European football
Under 20 Elite League, 2019-20